The Ongerup Football Association is an Australian rules football competition based in the Great Southern region of rural Western Australia.  It was formed in 1962 with the current reserves competition inaugurated in 1980.

History 
The Association commenced in 1962 with just two clubs, Ongerup and Hassell.  After two seasons, Borden and Pingrup joined, making four clubs. Hassell demerged in 1968 into Jerramungup and Boxwood Hills making five clubs. 

Kent Districts joined in 1972 after leaving the Central Great Southern Football League and won the premiership the following year.  Newdegate was next to join the Association when the ‘Lions’ entered in 1983. Gnowangerup then joined in 1987 after also leaving the CGSFL with the last team to join being Lake Grace with an immediate merger with Pingrup ending up in Lake Grace/Pingrup. 

The 2010s was a tough decade for the OFA with Ongerup, Kent & Borden all folding taking it from an 8 to a 5 team competition.

Current clubs

Previous clubs

Grand final results 

Notes: * Undefeated season, # First loss of season
Source: OFA Grand Final Program 2020

Ladders

2015 ladder

2016 ladder

2017 ladder

2018 ladder

2019 ladder

2020 ladder 

Shortened season due to the COVID-19 pandemic

AFL players
Tony Evans - 
Quentin Lynch - , 
Jason Spinks - , 
Brett Spinks - , 
Chris Mayne - , Collingwood
Mark Williams - , 
Cale Morton - 
Jarrod Morton - 
Liam Baker - 
Nat Fyfe - Fremantle
Angus Litherland - Hawthorn

References

Further reading 
 A Way of Life - The Story of country football in Western Australia - Alan East

Australian rules football competitions in Western Australia